Shakuntala is a 1920 film directed by Suchet Singh.

Plot
Raja Dushyanta going to hunt in a forest happens upon a beautiful maiden, her name was  Shakuntala. Raja instantly falls in love with her. He gives her a ring as a symbol of his affection and commitment to marry. After return, Raja has an attack of amnesia and Shakuntala loses the ring in a lake, so she could not convince him of who she is.

Cast
 Dorothy Kingdon as Shakuntala
 Goharjaan as Raja Dushyanta
 Samson as Sampson
 Sutria as Mrs. Sutria
 Signorina Albertini		
 Khorshedji Engineer
 Kanjibhai Rathod
 Rewashankar
 Dadibhai Sarkari
 Isaac Simon

References

External links

1920 films
Indian black-and-white films
Indian silent films
Films based on works by Kalidasa
Works based on Shakuntala (play)